STEM in 30 is a non-commercial online science educational program for middle school students produced by the Smithsonian's National Air and Space Museum in Washington, D.C. The show is hosted by science-educators Marty Kelsey and Beth Wilson. The program is released on a monthly basis throughout the school year free through the museum's website, YouTube and social media as well as broadcast on NASA-TV. Each episode is typically a half hour and features special guests and different science, math, engineering or technology topics.

Since first broadcasting in 2014, the program has covered dozens of topics including the NASA's Apollo program, Tuskegee Airmen, astronaut training, the Wright brothers and the Orion program. While the program is often based in the one of the two locations of the National Air and Space Museum, the show has also been filmed on location in New York City, Seattle, Boston, Detroit, Houston, in Hurricane Florence and on the aircraft carrier .

The first four seasons of the show were broadcast live with a student audience. With its fifth season, STEM in 30 has switched its format to a pre-taped show along with a "Mission Debrief" a week later featuring a topic expert. The "Mission Debrief" is a live question and answer session about that month's topic.

In 2019, the first episode of season five, "Robotics: FIRST There Were People, Then There Were Machines," was nominated for a National Capital / Chesapeake Bay Emmy Award for Technology Program. The program has since received five regional Emmy nominations in total.

List of episodes

Awards 

|-
| 2016
| 15 Years on the ISS
| Telly Award
| 
|-
| 2019
| Robotics: FIRST There Were People, Then There Were Machines
| National Capital / Chesapeake Bay Emmy Award - Technology Program
| 
|-
| 2020
| Top of the Tower: How Air Traffic Control Keeps the Skies Safe
| National Capital / Chesapeake Bay Emmy Award - Education/Schools - Program/Special
| 
|-
| 2020
| A Flight with the 53rd Weather Reconnaissance Squadron, the Hurricane Hunters
| National Capital / Chesapeake Bay Emmy Award - Weather - Program/Special
| 
|-
| 2021
| Get Excited About the Creepy Crawly Stuff! The GW Buzz
| National Capital / Chesapeake Bay Emmy Award - Education/Schools - Short Form Content
|
|-
| 2021
| Spy Planes: Eyes in the Sky
| National Capital / Chesapeake Bay Emmy Award -  Informational/Instructional - Long Form Content
|

References

External links 

 Official website
 Episode archive

Science education
Video on demand series
Smithsonian Institution